The Sukuna Bowl is an annual rugby union fixture that usually takes place in Suva, Fiji. The game is usually played at the ANZ National Stadium. The Sukuna Bowl is contested between the Fiji Police Force and the Fiji Military Force.

The 2015 Sukuna Bowl took place at the ANZ Stadium in Suva, Fiji. The Fiji Police Force won the match against the Republic of Fiji Military Forces.

Past winners
2021: Army
2020: Police 32 -8 Army
2019: Army 20-17 Police
2018: Police 41-17 Army
2017: Army 19-12 Police
2016: Police 22-12 Army
2015:Police 25-17 Army
2014: Army 18-10 Police
2013: Police 25-24 Army
2012: Police 17-15 Army
2011: Army
2010 Army 14-0 Police
2009 Police 14-11 Army

See also
 Rugby union in Fiji

External links
 Coup on hold for rugby
 Sukuna Bowl Clash Still On

Rugby union competitions in Fiji